Jake may refer to:

Name
 Jake (given name), including a list of persons and fictional characters with the name
 Katrin Jäke (born c. 1975), German swimmer
 Jake (gamer), American Overwatch player and coach

Animals
 Jake (rescue dog), a search and rescue dog in the United States
 Jake, a young male wild turkey

Slang
 Jake, a slang term in the United States for Jamaica ginger extract
 Jake, a slang term used in Discordianism to describe a prank, often celebrated on Jake Day
 Jake, a slang term in the United Kingdom to call police

Other uses
 Allied reporting name of the Aichi E13A, a Japanese World War II reconnaissance floatplane
 "The Jake," nickname of the Major League Baseball stadium once known as Jacobs Field, now Progressive Field
 Jake the Alligator Man, an oddity on view in Long Beach, Washington
 Jake / Bot2, one of the remotely operated vehicles used during the filming of the documentary Ghosts of the Abyss
 Jake the Dog, a character from the Cartoon Network series Adventure Time

See also
 Jakes (disambiguation)